The National Consumer Disputes Redressal Commission (NCDRC) of India is a quasi-judicial commission in India which was set up in 1988 under the Consumer Protection Act, 1986. Its head office is in New Delhi. The commission is headed by a sitting or retired judge of the Supreme Court of India. The present head is Justice R K Agrawal, former judge of the Supreme Court of India.

See also 
 Manu Needhi Consumer and Environmental Protection Centre

References

External links 
 

1988 establishments in Delhi
Consumer organisations in India
Indian commissions and inquiries
Legal organisations based in India
Organizations established in 1988
Quasi-judicial bodies of India